Frank Cloud Cooksey (born June 3, 1933) is an American public servant. He served as student body president of the University of Texas in the 1950s.  He worked as an attorney in the Civil Rights division of the U.S. District Attorney, the Texas Attorney General's office (under John Hill) and in private practice. He served as mayor of Austin, Texas from 1985 to 1988.  He is also an environmental activist, and is known for his progressive stance during his term as mayor.

References

Mayors of Austin, Texas
1933 births
Living people